Prince Deokheung (Hangul: 덕흥군, Hanja: 德興君), personal name Wang Hye was the third son of Chungseon of Goryeo who became a Mongolian-backed pretender to the throne of Goryeo. After the ascension of King Gongmin, his half-nephew, to the throne of Goryeo, Prince Deokheung left Goryeo and settled in the Yuan capital of Dadu. Since then, he was also known by his Mongolian name, Tash Temür (塔思帖木兒) which spelled as Tapsacheopmoka (탑사첩목아) in Sino-Korean. At one point in his life, he was a Buddhist monk but he later returned to a secular life.

The Yuan Dynasty, under the influence of Empress Gi and her brother, Gi Cheol, attempted to dethrone Goryeo's king, Gongmin. Immediately after Gongmin executed Gi Cheol, the leader of the pro-Yuan Faction (친원파), his sister then deposed Gongmin and declared Wang Hye as the new King, with her nephew, Gi Sambono as the Crown Prince. In 1364, Wang led a force 10,000 Yuan soldiers under the command of General Choe Yu (최유, 崔濡) and attempted to invade Goryeo, but he failed in his objective to dethrone King Gongmin.  After crossing Yalu River, his army was defeated by Goryeo forces led by Choe Yeong and Yi Seong-gye and Prince Deokheung was forced to retreat back to the Yuan Dynasty. Knowing this, the Yuan Emperor struck him with 107 Gonjang (곤장 107대) and then expelled them.

In popular culture
Portrayed by Heo Ki-ho in the 2005–2006 MBC TV Series Shin Don.
Portrayed by Park Yoon-jae in the 2012 SBS TV series Faith.

See also
Chungseon of Goryeo
Chungsuk of Goryeo
Gongmin of Goryeo

References
Cites

External links
Prince Deokheung on Doosan Encyclopedia .
Prince Deokheung on Encykorea .

Korean princes
Pretenders to the Korean throne
Year of birth unknown
Year of death unknown
Date of birth unknown
Date of death unknown
14th-century Korean people